The 2018 United States House of Representatives elections in Arizona were held on November 6, 2018, to elect the nine U.S. representatives from the State of Arizona, one from each of the state's nine congressional districts. The elections coincided with the 2018 Arizona gubernatorial election, as well as other elections to the U.S. House of Representatives, elections to the United States Senate and various state and local elections. The 2018 general elections saw the Democratic party gain the 2nd Congressional district, thus flipping the state from a 5–4 Republican advantage to a 5–4 Democratic advantage, the first time since the 2012 election in which Democrats held more House seats in Arizona than the Republicans.

Overview

Results of the 2018 United States House of Representatives elections in Arizona by district:

District 1 

The 1st district is home to the Grand Canyon and stretches along the eastern and northeastern portions of the state and includes Casa Grande, Flagstaff, and Marana. This district has a significant Native-American population, making up 25% of the population in the district. This district is home to a number of Indian reservations, including the Gila River Indian Community, Hopi Reservation, and the Navajo Nation. Incumbent Democratic Congressman Tom O'Halleran won election to his first term in 2016 with 50.90 percent of the vote over Republican nominee Paul Babeu. This district is one of the most competitive in the state with a PVI of R+2. In 2018, the district was one of 36 Democratic-held House districts targeted by the National Republican Congressional Committee.

Democratic primary 
Candidates
 Tom O'Halleran, incumbent

Withdrew
Miguel Olivas

Primary results

Republican primary

Candidates 
Tiffany Shedd, attorney
Wendy Rogers, retired air force pilot and perennial candidate
Steve Smith, State Senator

Declined
 T. J. Shope, state representative

Polling

Endorsements

Primary results

Libertarian primary

Candidates 
 Zhani Doko (write-in candidate)

General election

Polling
{| class="wikitable" style="font-size:90%"
|- valign= bottom
! Poll source
! Date(s)administered
! Samplesize
! Margin oferror
! style="width:100px;"| TomO'Halleran (D)
! style="width:100px;"| WendyRogers (R)
! Other
! Undecided
|-
| Optimus/DDHQ
| align=center| October 31 – November 1, 2018
| align=center| 756
| align=center| ± 3.56%
|  align=center| 48%
| align=center| 45%
| align=center| 1%
| align=center| 6%
|-
| American Viewpoint (R)
| align=center| October 16–18, 2018
| align=center| 400
| align=center| ± 4.9%
| align=center| 46%
| align=center| 46%
| align=center| –
| align=center| 5%
|-
| Go Right Strategies (R-Rogers)
| align=center| October 9–10, 2018
| align=center| 943
| align=center| ± 3.0%
| align=center| 38%
|  align=center| 44%
| align=center| –
| align=center| 18%
|-
| Go Right Strategies (R-Rogers)
| align=center| September 27–28, 2018
| align=center| 738
| align=center| ± 4.0%
| align=center| 36%
|  align=center| 39%
| align=center| –
| align=center| 24%

Predictions

Results

District 2 

The 2nd district is based in the southeastern corner of Arizona and includes Cochise County and parts of suburban Tucson. Republican Martha McSally was reelected to a second term in 2016, defeating Democratic opponent Matt Heinz by a margin of 57 to 43 percent in the general election. In 2018, this district was one of 80 Republican-held House districts targeted by the Democratic Congressional Campaign Committee.

Democratic primary 
Candidates
 Matt Heinz, former state representative, candidate for AZ-08 in 2012 and nominee for this seat in 2016
 Ann Kirkpatrick, former U.S. Representative for Arizona's 1st District and nominee for U.S. Senate in 2016
 Billy Kovacs, operations manager of Hotel Congress
 Mary Matiella, former assistant secretary of the Army
 Barbara Sherry
 Bruce Wheeler, former state representative
 Yahya Yuksel

Withdrew
 Charlie Verdin, small businessman

Declined
 Brian Bickel, candidate for Pima County Supervisor in 2016
 Randall Friese, state representative
 Jeff Latas, retired air force fighter pilot and candidate for AZ-08 in 2006
 Victoria Steele, former state representative and candidate for this seat in 2016
 Lou Jordan, retired U.S. Army colonel
 Joshua Polacheck, foreign service officer

Polling

Primary results

Republican primary 
Candidates
 Lea Márquez Peterson, president of the Tucson Hispanic Chamber of Commerce
 Brandon Martin, Army instructor
 Danny Morales, former Douglas city councilman
 Casey Welch

Withdrew 
 Martha McSally, incumbent (running for the U.S. Senate)
 Marilyn Wiles

Declined
Shelley Kais of Sahuarita, candidate for state Senate in 2016
Todd Clodfelter, state representative
J. Christopher Ackerley, former state representative
Gail Griffin, former state representative
Ethan Orr, former state representative
David Gowan, former state representative
Ally Miller, Pima County Supervisor
Steve Christy, Pima County Supervisor

Primary results

General election

Debates
Complete video of debate, October 11, 2018

Polling

With Heinz
{| class="wikitable"
|- valign= bottom
! Poll source
! Date(s)administered
! Samplesize
! Margin oferror
! style="width:80px;"| MattHeinz (D)
! style="width:80px;"| LeaMarquez-Peterson (R)
! Undecided
|-
| Public Policy Polling (D-Heinz)
| align=center| February 8–10, 2018
| align=center| 841
| align=center| ± 3.4%
|  align=center| 45%
| align=center| 31%
| align=center| –

{| class="wikitable"
|- valign= bottom
! Poll source
! Date(s)administered
! Samplesize
! Margin oferror
! style="width:80px;"| MattHeinz (D)
! style="width:80px;"| MarthaMcSally (R)
! Undecided
|-
| Public Policy Polling (D-Heinz)
| align=center| May 5–7, 2017
| align=center| 944
| align=center| ± N/A
|  align=center| 48%
| align=center| 44%
| align=center| 8%

Predictions

Results

District 3 

The third district is based in Tucson and stretches along the southern border of Arizona including Yuma, rural portions of Maricopa County such as Gila Bend, and the western suburbs of Phoenix including Avondale, Buckeye, Goodyear, and parts of Litchfield Park. Raúl Grijalva has represented this district since 2002, and ran unopposed in 2016.

Democratic primary
Candidates
 Raúl Grijalva
 Joshua Garcia (write-in candidate)

Primary results

Republican primary
Candidates

Sergio Arellano, veteran
J. Nicholas Pierson, financial planner and community organizer
Edna San Miguel, schoolteacher

Withdrew
Bill Abatecola, businessmen (endorsed Arellano).

Primary results

General election

Results

District 4

The fourth district takes up most of rural northwestern and western Arizona and includes Kingman, Lake Havasu City, Prescott, and San Tan Valley. This is the most Republican district in Arizona with a PVI of R+21. Republican Paul Gosar was reelected to a fourth term in 2016 with 71% of the vote.

This congressional race received national media coverage during the general election after Democratic nominee David Brill aired television advertisements in which six of Republican incumbent Paul Gosar's nine siblings each condemned their brother and endorsed Brill, imploring residents of the fourth district to vote their brother out of office. Gosar responded to this advert with a tweet in which he dismissed his siblings' criticisms and characterized the six siblings as, "disgruntled Hillary supporters" who "put political ideology before family".

Democratic primary
Candidates

David Brill
Delina Disanto
Ana Maria Perez (write-in candidate)

Primary results

Republican primary
Candidates

Paul Gosar, incumbent

Primary results

Green primary
Candidates

Haryaksha Gregor Knauer

Primary results

General election

Polling

Notes

References

External links 
Candidates at Vote Smart
Candidates at Ballotpedia
Campaign finance at FEC
Campaign finance at OpenSecrets
Debates

Official campaign websites for first district candidates
Tom O'Halleran (D) for Congress
Wendy Rogers (R) for Congress

Official campaign websites for second district candidates
Ann Kirkpatrick (D) for Congress
Lea Marquez Peterson (R) for Congress

Official campaign websites for third district candidates
Raúl Grijalva (D) for Congress
Nick Pierson (R) for Congress

Official campaign websites for fourth district candidates
David Brill (D) for Congress
Paul Gosar (R) for Congress
Haryaksha Gregor Knauer (G) for Congress

Official campaign websites for fifth district candidates
Andy Biggs (R) for Congress
Joan Greene (D) for Congress

Official campaign websites for sixth district candidates
Anita Malik (D) for Congress
David Schweikert (R) for Congress

Official campaign websites for seventh district candidates
Ruben Gallego (D) for Congress

Official campaign websites of eighth district candidates
Debbie Lesko (R) for Congress
Dr. Hiral Tipirneni (D) for Congress

Official campaign websites of ninth district candidates
Steve Ferrara (R) for Congress
Greg Stanton (D) for Congress

2018
Arizona
United States House of Representatives